is a Japanese footballer who plays as a midfielder for  club FC Imabari. He is a versatile player who can play any midfield position and has also played as a right back.

Career 
Mikado started attending Ryutsu Keizai University in 2005, where he helped the team capture a Kantō University Championship in 2008 as well as earning Player of the Year.

After graduation from school in 2009, Mikado signed his first professional contract with Albirex Niigata. He made his debut on 26 September 2008 in a league match against Sanfrecce Hiroshima. Mikado started the match and played 90 minutes in a 2–1 victory.

In January 2014, he was transferred to the Japanese giant Yokohama F. Marinos. After two seasons with Marinos, Mikado transferred to Avispa Fukuoka in 2016. In January 2018, he opted to sign for Omiya Ardija. He was appointed captain of the club for the 2020 season.

In July 2022, he transferred to J3 League team FC Imabari.

Club career stats

References

External links
Profile at FC Imabari

1986 births
Living people
Ryutsu Keizai University alumni
Association football people from Saitama Prefecture
Japanese footballers
J1 League players
J2 League players
Albirex Niigata players
Yokohama F. Marinos players
Avispa Fukuoka players
Omiya Ardija players
FC Imabari players
Association football midfielders